The Army Mutiny was an Irish Army crisis in March 1924 provoked by a proposed reduction in army numbers in the immediate post-Civil War period. A second grievance concerned the  handling of the  Northern Boundary problem. As the prelude to a coup d'état, the decisions made by influential politicians and soldiers at the time have continuing significance for the Government of Ireland.

National Army
 
In the early weeks of the Civil War, the National Army comprised 7,000 men.  These came mainly from pro-Treaty IRA brigades, especially the Dublin Guard, whose members had personal ties to Michael Collins. They faced around 15,000 anti-Treaty IRA men and Collins recruited experienced soldiers from wherever he could. The army's size mushroomed to 55,000 men, many of whom were Irishmen with combat experience in World War I – 20,000 National Volunteers had joined the British Army on the urgings of Nationalist leader John Redmond.

Likewise, Irishmen who had served in the British forces accounted for over half of the 3,500 officers. W.R.E. Murphy, second-in-command (January–May 1923), had been a lieutenant colonel in the British Army, as had Emmet Dalton. Two more of the senior generals, John T. Prout and J.J. "Ginger" O'Connell, had served in the United States Army. Collins promoted fellow-members of the Irish Republican Brotherhood but was slow to put Squad members in high positions.

Irish Republican Army Organisation
In December 1922, following Collins's death, Liam Tobin formed the Irish Republican Army Organisation (IRAO), taking in Dublin Guard and other Irish Army officers who shared his view that "higher command...was not sufficiently patriotic".  President W. T. Cosgrave, head of the government attempted to appease the IRAO. He met with them several times before the September 1923 Election and persuaded the opposing IRB faction of generals under Richard Mulcahy to keep quiet.

With the election over, Mulcahy now ignored the IRAO as he started the process of demobilising 37,000 men. In November, sixty IRA officers mutinied and were dismissed without pay. The IRAO now pressured the Government into establishing a Committee to supervise future demobilisation. The Committee, consisting of Eoin MacNeill, Ernest Blythe, and IRAO sympathiser Joseph McGrath, effectively undermined the authority of the Army Council.

Ultimatum
On 7 March 1924 a representative of the IRAO handed a demand to end demobilisation to W. T. Cosgrave. The ultimatum was signed by senior Army officers, Major-General Liam Tobin  and Colonel Charles Dalton. Tobin knew his own position was to be scrapped in the demobilisation. Frank Thorton and Tom Cullen were also involved. That morning 35 men of the 36th Infantry Battalion had refused to parade and the preceding week officers had absconded with arms from Templemore, Gormanstown, Baldonnel Aerodrome and Roscommon. The immediate response was an order for the arrest of the two men on a charge of mutiny; this caused alarm throughout Dublin when announced.

On 8 March General Mulcahy made an announcement to the Army:
Two Army officers have attempted to involve the Army in a challenge to the authority of the Government. This is an outrageous departure from the spirit of the Army. It will not be tolerated...officers and men...will stand over their posts and do their duty today in this new threat of danger in the same wonderful determined spirit that has always been the spirit of the Army.

Leader of the Opposition, Thomas Johnson issued a statement of support for the Government. In contrast Minister for Industry and Commerce, Joseph McGrath, whose home Mulcahy ordered to be searched, resigned because of dissatisfaction with the government's attitude to the IRAO officers and support for their perception that the Irish Army treated former British officers better than former IRA officers. Fearing an incendiary speech by McGrath, Cosgrave first offered the IRAO an inquiry and an amnesty before then taking sick leave thus making Minister for Justice, Kevin O’Higgins, de facto head of the Government.

Kevin O'Higgins
Observers at the time have provided insights into the motivations of Cosgrave and O'Higgins. Cosgrave was an "unpretentious and modest man", O'Higgins "redoubtable". Generals Costello and MacEoin recounted that Cosgrave feigned illness, hoping O’Higgins would talk himself into resigning. Mrs Mulcahy and Mrs Cosgrave agreed O'Higgins wanted Cosgrave to resign.

On 18 March, 40 armed men assembled at Devlin's Hotel in Parnell Street, Dublin. Two lorry loads of troops were sent to surround the premises and a standoff developed with the mutineers. McGrath and Daniel McCarthy were allowed access as intermediaries. O'Higgins moved to resolve the problem. Strong reinforcements were dispatched. Tobin & Dalton were able to escape using an old path of retreat across the roofs, known from the days when Devlin's had been a safehouse for Michael Collins 

The cabinet, already wary of the Free State Army, ordered an inquiry and appointed Garda Commissioner Eoin O'Duffy to the army command. The cabinet demanded the resignation of the army council and the generals resigned. The crisis within the army was solved but the government was divided, Richard Mulcahy, the Minister for Defence, resigned and O'Higgins was victorious in a very public power struggle within Cumann na nGaedheal. However the events re-affirmed the subservience of the military to the civilian government of the new state.

McGrath and eight other TDs resigned from Cumann na nGaedheal then resigned their seats to contest by-elections, running as the National Party. However, Cumann na nGaedheal won seven of these and Sinn Féin won the other two.

Charlie Dalton
Charlie Dalton had started as an assassin with The Squad along with his brother, Emmet. He followed Michael Collins joining the pro-Treaty side and now held the position of colonel in the Army.

Dalton was born in 1903 and grew up around Columba's Road, Drumcondra, Dublin.

References
Citations

Sources
 

Mutiny
1924 in Ireland
Mutinies
Conflicts in 1924